William Dusenbery (born September 15, 1948) is a former American football running back who played one season with the New Orleans Saints of the National Football League (NFL). He was drafted by the Houston Oilers in the second round of the 1970 NFL Draft. He played college football at Johnson C. Smith University and attended Dunbar High School in Lexington, North Carolina.

References

External links
Just Sports Stats

Living people
1948 births
Players of American football from Washington, D.C.
American football running backs
Johnson C. Smith Golden Bulls football players
New Orleans Saints players